18 – Allein unter Mädchen (18 – Alone Among Girls) was a German comedy television series broadcast between 2004 and 2005. It centered on four eighteen-year-old boys, who, due to a ministerial decision, are sent to a conservative boarding school, against the wishes of the strict school headmistress.

See also
List of German television series

References

External links
 

German comedy television series
2004 German television series debuts
2005 German television series endings
German-language television shows
ProSieben original programming